Beatriz de Toledo Segall (25 July 1926 – 5 September 2018) was a Brazilian actress. One of her most notable works is the role of Odete Roitman on the telenovela Vale Tudo (1988).

Partial filmography
 24 Horas de Sonho (1941) as Glória Seydoux Gayet
 Pássaros de Asas Cortadas (1942)
 Fantasma Por Acaso (1946) as Libânia
 A Beleza do Diabo (1950)
 Cleo e Daniel (1970) as Cléo's Mother
 À Flor da Pele (1977) as Isaura
 Dancin' Days (1978, TV Series) as Celina
 O Cortiço (1978) as D. Isabel
 Diário da Província (1978)
 Pai Herói (1979, TV Series) as Norah Limeira
 Os Amantes da Chuva (1979)
 Água Viva (1980, TV Series) as Lurdes Mesquita
 Pixote (1981) as Widower
 Sol de Verão (1982, TV Series) as Laura
 Louco Amor (1983, TV Series) as Lourdes Mesquita
 Champagne (1983, TV Series) as Eunice
 Romance (1988) as Cecília
 Vale Tudo (1988-1989, TV Series) as Odete Roitman
 Barriga de Aluguel (1990, TV Series) as Miss Penelope Brown
 Sonho Meu (1993-1994, TV Series) as Paula Candeias de Sá
 Anjo Mau (1997, TV Series) as Clotilde 'Clô' Jordão
 Esperança (2002, TV Series) as Antônia
 Desmundo (2002) as Dona Brites
 Família Vende Tudo (2011) as Vivi Penteado
 Lado a Lado (2012, TV Series) as Madame Besançon
 Os Experientes (2015, TV Mini-Series) as Yolanda

References

External links

1926 births
2018 deaths
Brazilian telenovela actresses
Brazilian film actresses
Actresses from Rio de Janeiro (city)
20th-century Brazilian actresses
21st-century Brazilian actresses
Lafer-Klabin family